Jan Helenius (born 13 October 1996) is a Finnish male volleyball player. He is part of the Finland men's national volleyball team. On club level he plays for Bigbank Tartu.

Sporting achievements

Clubs
Baltic League
  2018/2019 – with Bigbank Tartu

National championship
 2018/2019  Estonian Championship, with Bigbank Tartu

References

External links
Profile at FIVB.org

1996 births
Living people
Finnish men's volleyball players
Place of birth missing (living people)
Finnish expatriate sportspeople in Estonia
Expatriate volleyball players in Estonia
People from Kotka
Sportspeople from Kymenlaakso